Edwin is a surname. Notable people with the surname include:

 Sir Humphrey Edwin (1642–1707), English merchant and Lord Mayor of London
 Charles Edwin (died 1756), Welsh politician, MP for Westminster 1741–47, for Glamorgan 1747–56
 Charles Edwin (died 1801), Welsh politician, MP for Glamorgan 1780–89
 Samuel Edwin (1671–1722), British politician, MP for Minehead 1717

English-language surnames